The Ibestad Tunnel is an undersea tunnel in the municipality of Ibestad in Troms og Finnmark county, Norway. The tunnel connects the islands of Rolla and Andørja. The western end of the tunnel begins in the village of Hamnvik on Rolla. Then the tunnel goes under the Bygda strait and connects to the village of Sørvika on the island of Andørja.

The tunnel, together with the Mjøsund Bridge, are part of Norwegian County Road 848 which is a ferry-free road connection between the islands of Rolla and Andørja to the mainland of Norway.

References

Ibestad
Road tunnels in Troms og Finnmark
Roads within the Arctic Circle